Tetratoma ancora is a species of beetle belonging to the family Tetratomidae.

It is native to Europe.

References

Tenebrionoidea
Beetles described in 1790